Mathematicians in Love is a science fiction novel by American writer Rudy Rucker.

Plot summary
Bela and Paul are working towards their Ph.Ds under the direction of a mad math genius named Roland Haut, they invent a para-computer called "GoBubble" that predicts the future.  They are both involved in a love triangle with Alma.

Reception
Publishers Weekly in their review said that "Rucker cleverly pulls off a romantic comedy about mathematicians in love" and that "While most of the mathematical flights may stun hapless mathophobes, Rucker's wild characters, off-the-wall situations and wicked political riffs prove that writing SF spoofs, like Bela's rock music avocation, "beats the hell out of publishing a math paper."  Carl Hays in his review for Booklist said that "in a riotously twisting plot, complete with hypertunnels, alien shellfish from a parallel universe, and an improbable resolution to the threesome’s romantic dilemma, Rucker pulls out all the stops for one of his most entertaining yarns to date."

References

External links
Rudy Rucker's notes

2006 American novels
2006 science fiction novels
Novels by Rudy Rucker
American romance novels
Tor Books books